Neve Adrianne Campbell (born October 3, 1973) is a Canadian actress. She is known for her work in the drama and horror genres.

Following a series of minor appearances, Campbell played a starring role in the drama series Catwalk (1992–1994) and the television film The Canterville Ghost (1996), the latter winning her a Family Film Award for Best Actress. She subsequently relocated to the United States to play the role of Julia Salinger in the Fox teen drama series Party of Five (1994–2000), which was her breakthrough role, earning her recognition as a teen idol and a nomination for the Teen Choice Award for Choice TV Actress. While on the show, she starred in her first American feature film, headlining the supernatural blockbuster The Craft (1996).

Campbell rose to international prominence for starring as Sidney Prescott in Wes Craven's slasher film Scream (1996), which emerged as a critical and commercial success—becoming the highest grossing slasher film for over 20 years—and obtained a cult following. The success of the film spawned the Scream franchise, for which she reprised the role in the series' second (1997), third (2000), fourth (2011) and fifth (2022) installments, playing the role for 25 years. Although critical reception has varied with each film, Campbell has consistently earned praise for her work, and is one of the genre's highest-grossing and acclaimed heroines of all time. Scream has earned her several accolades, including two Blockbuster Entertainment Awards for Best Actress, a Fangoria Chainsaw Award for Best Actress, a Saturn Award for Best Actress, and an MTV Award for Best Female Performance, all of which were collectively awarded for the first two installments.

Campbell has achieved success in films such as the neo-noir thriller Wild Things (1998), 54 (1998) and the crime films Drowning Mona and Panic (both 2000), all of which garnered acclaim. She furthered this success with roles in the drama films Last Call (2002), The Company (2003) and When Will I Be Loved (2004), the comedies Churchill: The Hollywood Years (2004) and Relative Strangers (2006) and the romantic-drama Closing the Ring (2007); Last Call won her the Prism Award for Best Performer in a TV Film/Miniseries. She returned to television after Closing the Ring, playing Olivia Maidstone in the NBC action drama series The Philanthropist (2009), LeAnn Harvey in the Netflix political thriller series House of Cards (2016–2017) and Margaret McPherson on the Netflix crime drama The Lincoln Lawyer (2022–present). She appeared in the miniseries Titanic: Blood and Steel (2012) and continues to work in film, starring in the comedy-drama Walter (2015), the action film Skyscraper (2018), the Canadian drama Castle in the Ground (2019) and the musical drama Clouds (2020).

Early life 
Campbell's Dutch mother, Marnie (née Neve), is a yoga instructor and psychologist from Amsterdam. She descends from Sephardic Jews who immigrated to the Netherlands and converted to Catholicism. Her Scottish father, Gerry Campbell, immigrated to Canada from his native Glasgow, and taught high school drama classes in Mississauga, Ontario. Campbell's maternal grandparents ran a theatre company in the Netherlands, and her paternal grandparents were also performers. Campbell has an older brother, Christian Campbell, and two younger half-brothers, Alex Campbell and Damian Campbell. Her parents divorced when she was two.

At age six, she saw a performance of The Nutcracker and decided she wanted to take ballet, enrolling at the Erinvale School of Dance. She later moved into residence at the National Ballet School of Canada, training there and appearing in performances of The Nutcracker and Sleeping Beauty. After accumulating numerous dance-related injuries, she moved into acting at age 15, performing in The Phantom of the Opera at the Canon Theatre in Toronto while attending John F. Ross Collegiate Vocational Institute in Guelph, where she trained in acting and worked in theatre. One of her classmates was actress Tara Strong.

Campbell's early work included a 1980s Eaton's department store Christmas commercial, and a 1991 Coca-Cola commercial; she promoted the latter's sponsorship on Bryan Adams' Waking Up the Nation Tour (1991–1992).

Career

1990s 
Campbell made an uncredited cameo appearance on the series My Secret Identity in 1991. The next year, she played the minor role of Laura Capelli on an episode of The Kids in the Hall, and landed her first starring role as Daisy in the Canadian drama series Catwalk. She subsequently made several guest appearances on various Canadian television shows, such as Are You Afraid of the Dark? and Kung Fu: The Legend Continues, both occurring in 1994.With a desire to perform in Hollywood, Campbell went to Los Angeles to find a talent manager to represent her, and ended up going on several auditions while she was doing so. One of these auditions was for Party of Five, which cast her in the role of orphaned teenager Julia Salinger, whereupon Campbell permanently relocated to the United States to play the role. Party of Five premiered in 1994, and went on to receive critical acclaim, winning the Golden Globe Award for Best Drama in 1996. Campbell's performance on the series was lauded by critics and audiences alike, described as "television's most believable teenager"; the series is credited as her breakthrough role.

After appearing on Party of Five for six seasons, Campbell did not renew her contract for a seventh season to pursue film work, which led the series' end in 2000. Her first widely released film was The Craft (1996), which she starred in alongside Robin Tunney, Fairuza Balk and Rachel True. The movie was a surprise hit, earning $55 million against a budget of $15 million. Her work in The Craft was noticed by director Wes Craven, who specifically asked her to audition for the role of Sidney Prescott in 1996's Scream, believing that the actress could be "innocent", but also handle herself once emotional and psychical conflicts arose. Scream was released to major commercial and critical success, earning over $173 million at the worldwide box office which made it the highest-grossing slasher film until the release of Halloween (2018). Her performance received significant critical praise. Variety magazine described Campbell as "charismatic", and the Los Angeles Times called both her acting and the character "iconic". For her performance, she won the Fangoria Chainsaw Award for Best Actress and the Saturn Award for Best Actress.

In 1997, Campbell reprised the role of Sidney in Scream 2, which earned over $170 million and like the first installment, was critically acclaimed. Patrick Mullen of Medium website stated that "I've always appreciated Neve Campbell in the lead just as much. She plays the role so straight while everyone else winks at the camera. It may sound like it wouldn't work, but it actually does. Sidney Prescott is a more compelling heroine than you usually get in a horror movie." She won the MTV Movie Award for Best Female Performance for her work in Scream 2.

In 1998, Campbell had roles in Hairshirt and 54 and voiced Kiara in the Disney animated musical film The Lion King II: Simba's Pride. She also appeared in the erotic thriller film Wild Things alongside Kevin Bacon, Matt Dillon and Denise Richards. Glamour praised Campbell's character in the latter, describing it as one of "the most well-rounded, fascinating, and exciting characters to ever grace the screen." In 2022, a retrospective review of Wild Things from The New York Times written by Abbey Bender dubs her character a "femme fatale" and called Campbell's acting a "calculated performance of self-assured femininity inspires fear, arousal and awe in equal measure."

2000s 

Campbell went on to appear in several films that received a limited theatrical release, but were well reviewed by critics, including the film Panic, in which she starred with William H. Macy and Donald Sutherland. Campbell starred again as Sidney Prescott in Scream 3 (2000), which earned over $160 million but marked a temporary end for the franchise following mixed reviews. In his review of Scream 3, Roger Ebert wrote: "The camera loves her. She could become a really big star and then giggle at clips from this film at her AFI tribute." In retrospective, the parallels between Scream 3's themes of abuse and the Harvey Weinstein sexual abuse cases came to light. In 2002, she starred in Last Call with Sissy Spacek and Jeremy Irons, for which she won a Prism Award for Performance in TV Movie or Miniseries.

Campbell co-wrote, produced and starred in the 2003 film The Company, which is about Chicago's Joffrey Ballet. The following year, she led the independent film When Will I Be Loved (2004), which was praised by critics; Roger Ebert wrote that Campbell gave a performance that was "carnal, verbally facile, physically uninhibited and charged with intelligence. Not many actresses could have played this character, and fewer still could give us the sense she's making it up as she goes along." In March 2006, Campbell made her West End theatre debut, in a version of Arthur Miller's Resurrection Blues at the Old Vic theatre. Matthew Modine and Maximilian Schell also appeared in the play, which received mixed reviews. Resurrection Blues was directed by Robert Altman, with whom Campbell had previously worked in The Company.

Later in 2006, Campbell performed again in the West End in Love Song, alongside Cillian Murphy, Michael McKean and Kristen Johnston, to mixed reviews. The latter half of the 2000s saw sporadic work from Campbell, due to a hiatus; most notably, on June 24, 2009, she had a starring role on NBC's short-lived series The Philanthropist. She later explained the hiatus by saying it "got to a level, also, where the kinds of things that I was being offered were not the things I wanted to do. I was constantly being offered horror films, because I was known for horror films, or bad romantic comedies." On her overall career progression, she has stated that "I think I went from being a young girl/ingénue to a woman, which was great for me."

2010s 
In 2011, Campbell starred in The Glass Man, which received a limited release. Also in 2011, 11 years after the previous installment, Campbell made her comeback to the Scream franchise with Scream 4 (2011), which received positive reviews and earned over $97 million. For her performance, she was nominated for Best Actress at the Scream Awards in 2011. On reprising the role of Sidney Prescott in future works, Campbell stated that "It would have to be something really special and really different. They'd have to be really convincing about who they decided to bring on as director, and I'd still have to do a bit of soul-searching on that one."

Campbell next starred in the drama film Singularity, which premiered at Cannes Film Festival in May 2012. She also appeared in the 2012 miniseries Titanic: Blood and Steel, and starred in the 2013 Lifetime crime film An Amish Murder. Campbell guest-starred in several television series, including the NBC supernatural drama Medium, the Fox animated sitcom The Simpsons, the ABC medical drama Grey's Anatomy, the AMC period drama Mad Men, and the NBC sitcom Welcome to Sweden. In 2015, she guest starred in the WGN period drama series Manhattan.

On June 30, 2015, it was announced that Campbell would star as Texas-based political consultant LeAnn Harvey in the Netflix television drama House of Cards, beginning in the fourth season. On the role of Harvey, the actress said in an interview with Business Insider that "I knew that what I wanted was a cable show with a good cast, and good writing, and it was respected, and an ensemble where I'm not carrying it, and then this came along. And then I couldn't have asked for anything better." Campbell was particularly praised by GQ magazine for her performance, who called her the "best thing" of the season and wrote that "she was exactly the competitor that the show's anti-heroes needed". In 2016, Campbell was honoured with the National Award of Excellence by the Association of Canadian Radio and Television Artists (ACTRA).

On June 22, 2017, it was reported that Campbell would star in Rawson Marshall Thurber's action film Skyscraper. She played Sarah Sawyer, the wife of Will (Dwayne Johnson). The film was released on July 13 the following year to box office success, grossing over $304 million worldwide; in spite of this, the film earned mixed reviews. Campbell co-starred as Valerie Gannon in the 2018 independent drama film Hot Air. In 2019, Campbell starred as Rebecca Fine, a single mother struggling with a serious illness, in the Canadian drama film Castle in the Ground. The film had its world premiere at the 2019 Toronto International Film Festival and received generally positive reviews.

2020s 
It was announced in 2019 that Campbell would star as author Laura Sobiech in the biographical musical drama film Clouds, which is based on the true story of Zach Sobiech. She detailed her experience in playing the role, saying that "I'd have some stuff to shed every evening, there were days of heavy crying, and I'd just be drained." It was released in 2020 to positive reviews on Disney+. Variety magazine described Campbell's acting as "well played within narrow bounds". IndieWire stated that she does "a fine job of balancing unimaginable pain with hard-fought moments of joy" and that she "distills Laura Sobiech's religious fervor into a more general desperation".

In September 2020, it was confirmed that Campbell would be reprising her role as Sidney Prescott for the fifth Scream film, directed by Matt Bettinelli-Olpin and Tyler Gillett. She was initially "apprehensive" and hesitant to take the role given the death of Wes Craven; however, she was convinced to join once "the new directors came to me with this beautiful letter saying that they've become directors and love film because of these films, and because of Wes, and they really want to be true to his story and his journey with these films, so I was really happy to hear that." The film was released on January 14, 2022, and earned widespread acclaim. It was also a major commercial success, grossing over $135 million against a budget of $24 million. Campbell was lauded for her performance once more, and she was particularly praised for her "fresh" take on the role of Prescott. The Hollywood Reporter wrote that "... it's a pleasure to see Campbell again in fine form as Sidney, striding back into Woodsboro to take care of unfinished business." Elle magazine named her the "Reigning Queen of Scream" and stated that "Sidney might not have that impact on people were it not for Campbell's portrayal, rife with vulnerability, intelligence, and a palatable dose of humor."

In February 2021, Campbell was cast as Mickey Haller's ex-wife Margaret "Maggie" McPherson in a television adaptation of The Lincoln Lawyer for Netflix; The series premiered on May 13, 2022, and made it on Netflix's Top 10 that same day. It was received positively by critics, and Lara Solanki of Radio Times felt that she was more "dogged and determined, qualities she showed once again in this year's Scream reboot," and said that giving the actress more screen time "would not be an unwelcome development." The series was renewed for a second season on June 14, 2022, with Campbell set to return. In February 2022, Campbell signed with both The Gersh Agency and Anonymous Content. In May 2022, Campbell was cast as Raven in a recurring role for the Peacock television series adaptation of Twisted Metal.

Campbell was approached to reprise the role of Sidney Prescott in the sixth installment in the Scream franchise. At the Mad Monster Party Convention, she stated that "There's no script yet. There is a draft coming in soon is what I was told. Actually, I was supposed to call a producer yesterday, because he wanted to talk to me about what's going on. You know, we'll see. I'll read the script and see how I feel." In June 2022, it was announced she would not be returning to the Scream franchise after salary negotiations stalled with Paramount. She stated: "As a woman I have had to work extremely hard in my career to establish my value, especially when it comes to Scream. I felt the offer that was presented to me did not equate to the value I have brought to the franchise. It's been a very difficult decision to move on. To all my Scream fans, I love you. You've always been so incredibly supportive to me. I'm forever grateful to you and to what this franchise has given me over the past 25 years." IndieWire noted Campbell had spent 26 years acting in the franchise, and announced it was "the end of an era." Campbell expanded on her statement a few weeks later, saying she could not bear "walking on set and feeling undervalued" and that the offer would have been different had she been a man.

In August 2022, it was announced that Campbell had been cast in the lead role of the upcoming ABC series, Avalon, as Detective Nicole "Nic" Searcy. It was later announced in November 2022 that the series had been scrapped, though it was being shopped around to other networks.

Personal life 

Campbell has stated, "I am a practicing Catholic, but my lineage is Jewish, so if someone asks me if I'm Jewish, I say yes."

Campbell married Jeff Colt on April 3, 1995, and divorced in May 1998. In 2005, Campbell began dating John Light, whom she met while filming Investigating Sex. They became engaged in December 2005 and married in Malibu, California, on May 5, 2007. The couple lived together in Islington, London for five years, until Campbell filed for divorce on June 30, 2010, in Los Angeles.

In March 2012, Campbell and her partner, actor JJ Feild, confirmed that they were expecting their first child together. Their first son, Caspian, was born in August 2012. On June 29, 2018, Campbell announced on Instagram the adoption of their second son, Raynor.

Campbell revealed during an interview on the Kelly Clarkson Show in 2021 that she survived a bear attack at the age of 17, an incident that occurred while filming an unnamed project. Describing the attack, she said "I dipped my hand in honey and I run to this rock, and I turn around and I put my hand out and the bear is not slowing down and he's not coming for my hand, he grabs me by the leg and he pulls me through the forest. My mother was visiting set and she's screaming. The whole crew is frozen because nobody can believe what's happening. All I can think to say is, 'He's biting me,' like it's not obvious." Neither she, nor the rest of the personnel present, suffered any life-threatening injuries.

Public image 
Campbell has often been referred to as a sex symbol and scream queen, a title she has held since her breakout role in Party of Five in the 1990s. In addition to her work in the horror genre, Campbell twice successfully established herself in mainstream film and television, beginning from the late 1990s, and resuming in the 2010s following a hiatus, by focusing on dramatic works which have earned her equal praise. The role of Sidney Prescott as played by Campbell established her as one of the highest-grossing and acclaimed heroines of all time in the slasher genre. She and Jamie Lee Curtis have frequently been included on lists citing the best actresses in horror. Despite her status in the genre, she stated that she finds horror movies "difficult to watch". Campbell appeared on People magazine's list of "50 Most Beautiful People" twice, and Bustle magazine described her as "one of the most recognizable faces in Hollywood". She has also been recognized for her fashion style.

Campbell was name-dropped in the dance-pop album Dawn FM, which was performed and co-produced by The Weeknd. She was referenced in the single "Here We Go... Again" featuring Tyler, the Creator, with the lyric "I loved her right, make her scream like Neve Campbell." On an interview with James Corden, the actress detailed her reaction, stating that "Well at first, my publicist told me, and she was like, 'The Weeknd,' and I was like, 'Wait, which weekend? Last weekend?' I had no idea what she was talking about. And then I realized, 'Oh, the guy who played at the Super Bowl! That guy! Fellow Canadian. How cool."

Campbell has advocated against poverty and world hunger. In 2020, she and several other Scream co-stars hosted a charity event to raise funds for the National Breast Cancer Foundation. In July 2022, she appeared in an advertisement for the American Red Cross, where she played Sidney Prescott.

Filmography

Film

Television

Awards and nominations

See also 
 List of Canadian actors

References

External links 

 
 CNN interview  (January 13, 2004)
 IGN Films interview (January 5, 2004)
 E Online! interview (December 1997)

20th-century Canadian actresses
20th-century Roman Catholics
21st-century Canadian actresses
21st-century Roman Catholics
Actresses from Ontario
Canadian ballerinas
Canadian expatriates in the United Kingdom
Canadian film actresses
Canadian people of Dutch-Jewish descent
Canadian people of Scottish descent
Canadian Roman Catholics
Canadian stage actresses
Canadian television actresses
Canadian voice actresses
Jewish Canadian actresses
Living people
People from Guelph
Canadian Sephardi Jews
1973 births